Abbassi is both a surname and a given name. Notable people with the name include:

Ali Reza Abbassi, Iranian calligrapher
Abbassi Madani (1931-2019), President of the Islamic Salvation Front in Algeria

See also
 Abbasi (disambiguation)
El Hassan El-Abbassi (born 1984), Moroccan-born Bahraini long-distance runner